Namora, or Aquaria Nautica Neptunia, is a fictional character appearing in American comic books published by Marvel Comics. Created by Ken Bald and Syd Shores, she first appeared in Marvel Mystery Comics #82 (May 1947). She is from Atlantis and is the daughter of an Atlantean father and a human mother. Namora is the cousin of Namor the Sub-Mariner.

Mabel Cadena portrays Namora in her live-action debut in the Marvel Cinematic Universe film Black Panther: Wakanda Forever (2022).

Publication history

Namora first appeared in the 12-page comic story "The Coming of Namora!" published in Marvel Mystery Comics #82 (May 1947), pencilled by Ken Bald and inked by Syd Shores. Namora also featured on the cover drawn by Bob Powell. Her costume was designed by Sub-Mariner creator Bill Everett. Initially, she and Namor had no apparent familial relationship, and romantic interest was sometimes implied between the two.

She had her own comic book series, Namora, which ran from August–December 1948. While this title lasted three issues, she regularly appeared with Namor in Marvel Mystery Comics and also in Sub-Mariner until that series ended in 1955.

The character was not seen again for 16 years until she made a brief flashback appearance in the Silver Age Sub-Mariner series, in Sub-Mariner #33 (January 1971). Her death was established in Sub-Mariner #50 (June 1972), where her frozen body is shown to Namor, and her death is depicted in flashback in #51 (July 1972).

Over the next 30 years, Namora appeared in a number of flashbacks and alternate reality stories, including What If? #9 (June 1978), The New Warriors Annual #1 (1991), What If? #47 (March 1993), The New Warriors #44 (February 1994), Avengers: Forever #4-5 (March–April 1999), and Marvel: The Lost Generation #3-2 (December 2000-January 2001).

Namora eventually reappears, alive, in the Agents of Atlas series, in issues #1-6 (October 2006-March 2007). She also appears in Incredible Hulk #107-112 (August–December 2007), Giant-Size Marvel Adventures: Avengers #1 (September 2007), World War Hulk #2 (September 2007), Spider-Man Family #4 (October 2007), and Incredible Hercules #121-122 (November–December 2008).

Namora received an entry in The Official Handbook of the Marvel Universe: Golden Age 2004.

Fictional character biography
Namora is a character that originated in the Golden Age of Comic Books. Her original name was Aquaria Nautica Neptunia, but she was nicknamed "Namora" in honor of her cousin Namor. Like Namor, she is a hybrid mutant with superhuman strength and the power of flight by using the wings on her ankles. When her father was killed by treasure-hunting surface-dwellers, she fully changed her name to Namora, the Atlantean term for "Avenging Daughter", as Namor means "Avenging Son". She was Namor's cousin (though not by blood), and became his companion for a period of several years.

Namora was ultimately shown to have been fatally poisoned by the Lemurian terrorist Llyra.  She was survived by her clone, Namorita, whom she had passed off as her birth daughter because of Atlantian taboos against cloning. Marvel: The Lost Generation revealed that she had been a member of The Monster Hunters in 1956.

Agents of Atlas

Some time later, the Agents of Atlas find a damaged coffin, which appears to contain the mummified corpse of Namora. Upon closer inspection, Marvel Boy disables a holographic display creating the corpse image, revealing a well-preserved, alive Namora inside the coffin. When awakened, Namora joins in a fight against underwater sea creatures and displays just how powerful she is, shown to be equal in power to her cousin Namor.
 
Jimmy Woo offers her a spot, and Namora joins the Agents of Atlas, where she leads Venus to recover all memories of her past life as a siren, almost driving her mad in the process. It is then revealed by the enhanced bliss inducing powers of the naiad that Namora's innermost desire is to sleep with her cousin Namor.

Eventually the team manages to reach the Yellow Claw, revealed as the mastermind behind the Atlas Foundation, and willing to give his leading role to Jimmy Woo. Woo accepts, and Namora, as the other Agents, are employed to travel the world in Marvel Boy's spaceship to shut down any rebellious cell still pursuing criminal objectives.

At some point in her career as an Agent of Atlas she takes an extended leave, or leaves the role altogether, to join Amadeus Cho's group during the World War Hulk event.

World War Hulk

Angry over the death and subsequent vilification of her daughter at the onset of the superhero Civil War over government registration, Namora joins Amadeus Cho, Hercules and Angel to aid the Hulk. During the crisis, Hercules ends up holding the entire locality of Manhattan on his shoulders.

Amazon-Atlantean War
In the course of her membership in Cho's group, she shares a genuinely romantic kiss with Hercules.  Some time later, following the Secret Invasion, Hercules and Amadeus Cho vacation near an Atlantean city, and she and Hercules have a romantic fling.  This is interrupted by an Amazon attack. Namora aids Hercules in repelling the Amazons and rescuing Cho from their amorous and ultimately fatal attentions.

Dark Reign
The Agents of Atlas decide to oppose Osborn's agenda by taking on the role of "supervillains", in order to form close ties to Osborn. After some time, the group becomes aware of Norman's Cabal to find out that a member of the group is none other than Namora's cousin, Namor. Upon finding this out, the Agents confront Namor for his involvement in the group. Initially at odds with each other for their recent decisions, Namora and Namor end up kissing and beginning a relationship. Namora contemplates staying with Namor until it is revealed that it was Atlantean elders that plotted for them to start a relationship and mate a long time ago as human/Atlantean hybrids are so powerful. Namor and Namora decide to part ways as they were unsure how much of their feelings for each other were genuine and how much was due to the secret plotting of the elders.

Infinity
During Infinity, Namora's Atlantean School is chosen as one of the institutions set to do battle in the new Contest of Champions. However, Atlantis is attacked and decimated by the forces of Thanos before the competition can begin. Namora sends a desperate plea for help to Hank Pym, but the kingdom is destroyed before action can be taken.

Powers and abilities
Namora possesses superhuman strength, speed, agility, stamina, durability, and reflexes. She is nearly invulnerable as bullets and other missiles cannot penetrate her extremely tough skin. She can swim at superhuman speeds, breathe underwater, and is immune to the cold and pressures of the depths. She can also see better underwater than a normal human.

Reception

Accolades 

 In 2011, Comics Buyer's Guide ranked Namora 76th in their "100 Sexiest Women in Comics" list.
 In 2020, Scary Mommy included Namora in their "Looking For A Role Model? These 195+ Marvel Female Characters Are Truly Heroic" list.
 In 2020, CBR.com ranked Namora 2nd in their "Marvel: 10 Best Golden Age Heroines" list.
 In 2022, Screen Rant ranked Namora 2nd in their "Marvel's 10 Most Powerful Aquatic Characters" list and included her in their "10 Best Hercules Love Interests In Marvel Comics" list.

Other versions

Exiles
The second Namora first appeared in Exiles #46, and was created by Tony Bedard and Mizuki Sakakibara, and was associated with the multiversal travelers called the Exiles. She is an alternate-Earth counterpart of Namor the Sub-Mariner, rather than of Aquaria Nautica Neptunia, the Earth-616 Namora. She is a mutant with superhuman strength and the power of flight by using the ankle wings on her feet. Unlike the Marvel Universe Namor and Namora, she has the blue skin of most Atlanteans.

In Namora's universe, she became an early ally of Charles Xavier who convinced her to not attack the surface world. She would later do so, after anti-mutant hysteria led to the imprisonment of most mutants. Namora killed all of her Earth's superheroes, having the most difficulty with the Fantastic Four, and she conquered the world and ruled it for decades, before becoming 'unhinged' in time and forced to join the Exiles, much to her chagrin.  Having a haughty attitude, she acted like she was superior to the other members. Still, she has shown that she did care for them, as evidenced when she thought that Hyperion had killed Morph. She lashed out at Hyperion, breaking his neck. However, it was for naught. Hyperion recovered quickly and blasted Namora with his "flash vision", killing her. The Exiles later sent her body back to her home reality (Earth-2189) for burial.

Marvel Mangaverse
Namora appeared in the Marvel Mangaverse series. In the  story, "Eternity Twilight", Namora rescued Bruce Banner, who suffered temporary amnesia and have fallen for him not before Banner regained his memory involving the Hulk (a Godzilla-like beast accidentally summoned by Banner). Afterwards, Banner and Namora went back to the surface and helps Earth's heroes battle not only the Hulk, but also the demon-god Dormammu.

Marvel Her-oes
A teenaged version of Namora appears as one of the main protagonists in the all-ages Marvel Her-oes series, which was written by Grace Randolph. She attends the same high school as Jennifer Walters and Janet van Dyne, and hides her Atlantean heritage by claiming to be an exchange student from Greece under the name of "Namora Aquarius".

Ultimate Marvel
During the Ultimatum storyline, Thing, Invisible Woman, and Dr. Arthur Molekevic fight Doctor Dorcas alongside Namora and a Tiger Shark in Atlantis and defeat him.

In other media

Film 

 Namora appears in Black Panther: Wakanda Forever (2022), portrayed by Mabel Cadena. This version is a warrior from Talokan.

References

External links
 Namora at Marvel.com
 Namora profile at International Hero

Comics characters introduced in 1947
Fictional activists
Fictional characters with superhuman durability or invulnerability
Fictional princesses
Fictional queens
Golden Age superheroes
Marvel Comics Atlanteans (Homo mermanus)
Marvel Comics characters who can move at superhuman speeds
Marvel Comics characters with superhuman strength
Marvel Comics female superheroes
Marvel Comics mutants
Marvel Comics orphans
Timely Comics characters